WASP-18 is a magnitude 9 star located in the Phoenix constellation of the southern hemisphere. It has a mass of 1.25 solar masses.

The star, although similar to Sun in terms of overall contents of heavy elements, is depleted of carbon. Carbon to oxygen molar ratio of 0.23 for WASP-18 is well below solar ratio of 0.55.

Planetary system
In 2009, the SuperWASP project announced that a large, hot Jupiter type extrasolar planet, WASP-18b, was orbiting very close to this star.

Observations from the Chandra X-ray Observatory failed to find any X-rays coming from WASP-18, and it is thought that this is caused by WASP-18b disrupting the star's magnetic field by causing a reduction in convection in the star's atmosphere. Tidal forces from the planet may also explain the higher amounts of lithium measured in earlier optical studies of WASP-18.

See also
 SuperWASP
 List of extrasolar planets

References

Phoenix (constellation)
Planetary transit variables
F-type subgiants
F-type main-sequence stars
Planetary systems with one confirmed planet
J01372503-4540404
18
10069
07562
0185